Sword Art Online is an anime television series based on the light novel series of the same title written by Reki Kawahara and illustrated by abec.  The anime adaptation of Sword Art Online was announced at Dengeki Bunko Autumn Festival 2011, along with Reki Kawahara's other light novel series, Accel World. The anime is produced by Aniplex and Genco, animated by A-1 Pictures and directed by Tomohiko Ito with music by Yuki Kajiura. The first season aired on Tokyo MX, tvk, TV Saitama, TV Aichi, RKB, HBC and MBS between July 8 and December 23, 2012, and on AT-X, Chiba TV and BS11 at later dates. Adult Swim's Toonami programming block aired the anime starting on July 28, 2013. The series was also streamed on Crunchyroll and Hulu.

A second season, titled Sword Art Online II, aired July 5 to December 20, 2014. At Katsucon, it was announced that the English dub of the second season would air on Adult Swim's Toonami on March 29, 2015.

A third season, titled Sword Art Online: Alicization, began airing on October 7, 2018, with a one-hour world premiere which aired in Japan, the United States, Australia, France, Germany, Russia and South Korea on September 15, 2018. The first half of Sword Art Online: Alicization aired from October 7, 2018 through March 31, 2019. The second half, titled War of Underworld, aired on October 13, 2019. The final part of the War of Underworld series was originally scheduled to premiere on April 26, 2020, but due to the effects of the COVID-19 pandemic in Japan, it was rescheduled to July 12, 2020.

Alicization covered four cours (47 episodes) and adapted from the novel's ninth volume, Alicization Beginning, to the eighteenth volume, Alicization Lasting. The English dub of the third season premiered on February 10, 2019 on Adult Swim's Toonami programming block. The English dub version for the second cour of the second part of the third season premiered on Adult Swim's Toonami on November 8, 2020.

Series overview

Episode list

Season 1 (2012)

Season 2: II (2014)

Season 3: Alicization (2018–2020)

Notes

References

Lists of anime episodes
Sword Art Online